Proterra is an Ibero American organization promoting earthen architecture. It was initially founded as a four-year project of CYTED in 2001, but continued to become a UNESCO WHEAP partner in 2012.

References

Architecture organizations
Organizations established in 2001
UNESCO